Wilson Arnold Lewis (1873 – after 1898) was an English professional footballer who made 20 appearances in the Football League playing for Small Heath. He played as a centre forward.

Lewis was born in Evesham, Worcestershire. He joined Small Heath from Birmingham & District League champions Hereford Thistle in 1897. He made his Small Heath debut on 4 September 1897, the opening day of the 1897–98 Second Division season, in a 3–1 win at home to Burton Swifts. In his first 14 games he scored seven goals, but his form dipped in the latter part of the season, and the arrival of Bob McRoberts prompted Lewis's return to non-league football with Bromyard.

Honours
with Hereford Thistle
 Birmingham & District League champions: 1896–97

References

1873 births
Year of death missing
People from Evesham
English footballers
Association football forwards
Hereford Thistle F.C. players
Birmingham City F.C. players
Bromyard Town F.C. players
English Football League players
Date of birth missing
Place of death missing
Sportspeople from Worcestershire